Tobias Kratzer (born 17 January 1980) is a German stage director, especially of opera, who has worked internationally after winning a competition in Graz with two entries in 2008. He has staged works by Verdi and Wagner, but also contemporary music. He directed Wagner's Tannhäuser for the 2019 Bayreuth Festival.

Career 
Born in Landshut, Kratzer studied art history in Munich and Berne. After completion, he turned to studying staging plays and music theatre at the Bayerische Theaterakademie August Everding. His first productions were in 2006 at the Münchner Akademietheater Brecht/Weill's Die sieben Todsünden and in 2008 Werner Egk's Die Verlobung in St. Domingo. He staged at the Münchner Reaktorhalle in 2006 Verdi's La traviata, working for the first time with stage designer Rainer Sellmaier from Regensburg and the conductor Martin Wettges with whom he has frequently collaborated.

The team, called ATEF, won prizes at the competition "Ring Award" in Graz with productions of Verdi's Rigoletto. Kratzer had nominated two stagings under two pseudonyms, as Ginger Holiday, an American female director, and as Pedrak Topola from Bulgaria. Following the attention at the competition, the team received commissions from several opera houses; they staged in 2009 at the Bavarian State Opera Mozart's Così fan tutte, at the Theater Heidelberg his Die Zauberflöte, at the Wermland Opera in Karlstad, Sweden again Rigoletto, and in 2010 at the Leipzig Opera Handel's Admeto, and at the Graz Opera Bellini's La sonnambula.

In the 2010/11 season, Kratzer staged Der Rosenkavalier by Richard Strauss at the Theater Bremen, Donizetti's Anna Bolena at the Lucerne theatre, which was nominated as "Opera of the Year" by Opernwelt, and Telemaco at the Schwetzingen Festival and the Theater Basel. The following season, Kratzer staged Wagner's Tannhäuser at the Theater Bremen, a scenic version of Bach's St John Passion at the Wermland Opera, and Erkki-Sven Tüür's Wallenberg at the Theater Karlsruhe.   

His staging of Lehar's Die Csárdásfürstin at the Stadttheater Klagenfurt was nominated for the 2015  in the category "Beste Regie" (Best staging). His production of Wagner's Die Meistersinger von Nürnberg at the Badisches Staatstheater Karlsruhe was nominated for the award Der Faust. In 2018, he staged a new production of Meyerbeer's L'Africaine – Vasco da Gama at the Oper Frankfurt as an interstellar drama of colonialism ("interstellares Kolonialismusdrama"). Conducted by Antonello Manacorda, with Michael Spyres, Claudia Mahnke and Kirsten MacKinnon in leading roles, the story was told as a combination of directing the characters, visionary images and sound magic ("Personenregie, Bildvision und Klangzauber").

Kratzer directed Wagner's Tannhäuser for the opening performance of the 2019 Bayreuth Festival.

References

External links 
 
 Peter Krause: Hände hoch, die Noten her (review Tannhäuser) Die Welt, 22 September 2011
 Göran Forsling: Christ Resurrected in Karlstad (review of Johannespassion) Seen and Heard International, 27 March 2012
 Nominierungen 
 Gerhart Wiesend, review of Kratzer's Amsterdam production of Les contes d'Hoffmann  2018
 Ein neuer Tannhäuser für Bayreuth – Regisseur Tobias Kratzer im Gespräch mit Joachim Lange (interview) Neue Musikzeitung 25 July 2019 

German directors
1980 births
Living people
People from Landshut